Podocarpus glaucus is a species of conifer in the family Podocarpaceae. It is found in Brunei, Indonesia, Malaysia, Papua New Guinea, the Philippines, and Solomon Islands.

References

glaucus
Least concern plants
Taxonomy articles created by Polbot